Tang-e Hamgun (also Romanized as Tang-e Hamgūn; also known as Hongūn, Tang-e Hangūn, and Tang-e Hongūl) is a village in Kuh Mareh Khami Rural District, in the Central District of Basht County, Kohgiluyeh and Boyer-Ahmad Province, Iran. At the 2006 census, its population was 71, in 13 families.

References 

Populated places in Basht County